Rechten der jeugd is a 1921 Dutch silent film directed by Maurits Binger.

Cast
 Annie Bos - Maria
 Adelqui Migliar - Schilder Gerard van Hogelanden
 Jan van Dommelen
 Jeanne Van der Pers
 Renee Spiljar
 Sophie Willemse

External links 
 

1921 films
Dutch silent feature films
Dutch black-and-white films
Films directed by Maurits Binger